Bunji or Bunji-ye may refer to:

Places
 Bunji-ye Karbasi, a village in Hormozgan Province, Iran
 Bunji-ye Maski, a village in Hormozgan Province, Iran
 Bunji-ye Saheli Latidan, a village in Hormozgan Province, Iran
 Bunji, Pakistan, a town in Gilgit-Baltistan, Pakistan

Other uses
 Bunji (era), Japan
 Bunji (given name)

See also
 Bungi (disambiguation)